The 2019 World Rowing Championships were held in Ottensheim, Austria from 25 August to 1 September 2019. Apart from Ottensheim, the right to host the championships was contested by Hamburg in Germany, Račice in the Czech Republic, and Varese in Italy.

The event determined the majority of qualifiers to the rowing competitions at the 2020 Summer Olympics and Paralympics in Tokyo, Japan.

On 21 August, three days before the championships, para-rower Dzmitry Ryshkevich from Belarus died after he capsized during a training session. He was expected to participate in the PR1M1x at his third consecutive championships.

Medal summary

Medal table

 Non-Olympic/Paralympic classes

Men's events

Women's events

Mixed para-rowing events

Event codes

References

External links
 Official website

 
World Rowing Championships
World Championships
World Rowing Championships
Rowing Championships
Sports competitions in Linz
Rowing in Austria
World Rowing Championships
World Rowing Championships